The women's singles event  in bowling at the 2001 World Games took place from 22 to 23 August 2001 at the Utenayu Bowl in Yokote, Japan.

Competition format
A total of 24 athletes entered the competition. Best ten athletes from preliminary round qualifies to the round-robin. In round-robin each player plays ten matches. For a win player gets 10 points and for a draw 5 points. Total pins and bonus points are counted as final result. From this stage the best three athletes advances to the finals.

Results

Preliminary

Semifinal

Finals

References

External links
 Results on IWGA website

Bowling at the 2001 World Games